Armand-Désiré de Vignerot du Plessis-Richelieu, duc d'Aiguillon (31 October 1761 – 4 May 1800), was a French military officer and politician.

Life and career

He was the only son of Emmanuel-Armand de Vignerot du Plessis-Richelieu and his wife, Louise-Félicité de Brehan. In 1788, he succeeded his father as Duke of Aiguillon.

In 1789, as a member of the National Assembly, he became one of the first to ally himself with the Third Estate and to renounce the privileges of the nobility. He became a general in the Republican Army, but had to flee during the Reign of Terror of 1793–1794.

According to Michael Kelly in his Reminiscences, the Duke of Aiguillon was, in 1796, in London with the revolutionaries Charles Lameth and the orator Dupont. He states that the duke had been 'one of the twelve peers of France, who, in former days, had an immense fortune, was a great patron of the arts, and so theatrical that he had a box in every theatre in Paris. He was particularly fond of music, and had been a pupil of Viotti (then leader of the Opera House orchestra, at which Kelly was stage manager).' Kelly introduced them to Richard Brinsley Sheridan and other friends, though the Duke of Queensberry refused to meet the Duke of Aiguillon. 

On learning that the Duke of Aiguillon's fortune was entirely lost or sequestered, Kelly arranged for him to make a little money by copying sheet-music, which he did secretly during the day, continuing to attend the theatre in the evening. Eventually, an order came from the Alien Office of the British Government that he and his friends must leave England in two days. The duke went to Hamburg, and was later condemned to be shot. 'They told me that he died like a hero,' wrote Kelly. The duke left his favourite Danish dog in Kelly's care, shedding many tears on parting from it: the animal outlived its master, but pined and died soon afterwards.

Notes 

1761 births
1800 deaths
Military personnel from Paris
Dukes of Aiguillon
Members of the National Constituent Assembly (France)
French generals
Politicians from Paris